Diego García Bravo (born 13 January 1990), known simply as Diego, is a Spanish footballer who plays for UD Gijón Industrial as a goalkeeper.

Club career
Born in Oviedo, Asturias, Diego spent three years in Real Madrid's youth system, leaving the club in 2009. Subsequently, he signed with Deportivo Aragón, playing one season in the Tercera División.

Diego joined UD Almería in the 2010 off-season, spending his first year with the reserves in the Segunda División B as backup. He was promoted to the first team after Diego Alves' departure to Valencia CF in the summer of 2011.

Diego made his official debut for the Andalusians on 7 September 2011, in a 2–0 extra time home win against CD Guadalajara in the second round of the Copa del Rey. In June 2013, he was released after failing to appear in a single league match. The following month, he signed a two-year contract with SD Ponferradina also from Segunda División.

On 26 January 2014, Diego was loaned to Elche CF Ilicitano of the third tier until June. On 21 January of the following year, he cut ties with Ponfe after failing to make any competitive appearances, and moved to third-division side CD Alcoyano two days later.

Subsequently, Diego took his game to the Spanish amateur leagues. He also had a very brief spell in Iceland with Vestri.

References

External links

1990 births
Living people
Spanish footballers
Footballers from Oviedo
Association football goalkeepers
Segunda División B players
Tercera División players
Tercera Federación players
Real Zaragoza B players
UD Almería B players
UD Almería players
SD Ponferradina players
Elche CF Ilicitano footballers
CD Alcoyano footballers
CD Olímpic de Xàtiva footballers
Atlético Sanluqueño CF players
CD Paracuellos Antamira players
UA Horta players
Vestri (football club) players
Spanish expatriate footballers
Expatriate footballers in Iceland
Spanish expatriate sportspeople in Iceland